The 2006 Royal Rumble was the 19th annual Royal Rumble professional wrestling pay-per-view (PPV) event produced by World Wrestling Entertainment (WWE). It was held for wrestlers from the promotion's Raw and SmackDown! brand divisions. The event took place on January 29, 2006, in the American Airlines Arena in Miami, Florida. As has been customary since 1993, the Royal Rumble match winner received a world championship match at that year's WrestleMania. For the 2006 event, the winner received their choice to challenge for either Raw's WWE Championship or SmackDown!'s World Heavyweight Championship at WrestleMania 22.

Six professional wrestling matches were featured on the event's supercard, a scheduling of more than one main event. The main feature of the event was the 2006 Royal Rumble match, which featured wrestlers from both brands. SmackDown!'s Rey Mysterio Jr., the second entrant, won the match by last eliminating Randy Orton, the thirtieth entrant, also from SmackDown!. The primary match on the SmackDown! brand, which was the main event match of the card, was Kurt Angle versus Mark Henry for the World Heavyweight Championship, which Angle won to retain the title. The predominant match on the Raw brand was Edge versus John Cena for the WWE Championship, which Cena won to win the title.

Production

Background
The Royal Rumble is an annual gimmick pay-per-view (PPV), produced every January by World Wrestling Entertainment (WWE) since 1988. It is one of the promotion's original four pay-per-views, along with WrestleMania, SummerSlam, and Survivor Series, dubbed the "Big Four". It is named after the Royal Rumble match, a modified battle royal in which the participants enter at timed intervals instead of all beginning in the ring at the same time. The 2006 event was the 19th event in the Royal Rumble chronology and was scheduled to be held on January 29, 2006, in the American Airlines Arena in Miami, Florida. It featured wrestlers from the Raw and SmackDown! brands.

The Royal Rumble match generally features 30 wrestlers. Traditionally, the winner of the match earns a world championship match at that year's WrestleMania. For 2006, the winner could choose to challenge for either Raw's WWE Championship or SmackDown!'s World Heavyweight Championship at WrestleMania 22.

Storylines 
The card consisted of six matches, as well as one dark match. The matches resulted from scripted storylines, where wrestlers portrayed heroes, villains, or less distinguishable characters to build tension and culminated in a wrestling match or series of matches. Results were predetermined by WWE's writers on the Raw and SmackDown brands, with storylines produced on their weekly television shows, Raw and SmackDown.

Prior to the annual Royal Rumble match, several qualifying matches for the match took place on WWE's flagship television programs. The first three qualifying matches were held on the January 9, 2006 edition of Raw. Chavo Guerrero Jr. defeated Rob Conway, Shelton Benjamin defeated Val Venis and Kane defeated Snitsky, meaning they had earned a place in the Rumble. A Battle Royal also took place on the January 16, 2006 edition of WWE Heat in addition to a Singles match between Trevor Murdoch and Antonio Thomas, which Murdoch won.

Royal Rumble qualification matches
Chavo Guerrero Jr.  defeated Rob Conway – Raw, January 9
Shelton Benjamin defeated Val Venis – Raw, January 9
Kane defeated Snitsky – Raw, January 9
Sylvan defeated Scotty 2 Hotty – WWE Velocity, January 15 (aired January 21)
Trevor Murdoch defeated Antonio – WWE Heat, January 16 (aired January 20)
Viscera defeated Lance Cade, Gregory Helms and Tyson Tomko in a Battle Royal match – WWE Heat, January 16 (aired January 20)
Jonathan Coachman defeated Jerry Lawler – Raw, January 23
The Mexicools (Psicosis and Super Crazy) defeated The Dicks (Chad and James) and The Full Blooded Italians (Nunzio and Vito) in a Triple Threat tag team match – SmackDown!, January 24 (aired January 27)

The main feud heading into the Royal Rumble on the Raw was between Edge and John Cena, with the two feuding over the WWE Championship. The feud started at New Year's Revolution when Cena won an Elimination Chamber match also involving 5 other superstars to retain the WWE title. Immediately after the match, however, Vince McMahon came out and stated that Edge was cashing in his Money in the Bank contract that he won at WrestleMania 21. Edge then came out with Lita and, two spears later, he pinned Cena to become WWE Champion. Then the next night, Edge held a live sex celebration which got smashed up by Cena and Cena delivered an FU on Lita and sent a message to Edge.

The main feud heading into the Royal Rumble on the SmackDown! brand was between Kurt Angle and Mark Henry over the World Heavyweight Championship. The World Heavyweight Championship was originally held by Batista. He defended the title against Henry at a SmackDown! live event in a steel cage match. Henry was disqualified in the match and Batista retained the title but his triceps were injured. As a result, he was forced to vacate the title on the January 13 episode of SmackDown!. Later on, a 20-man battle royal was arranged to determine the new World Heavyweight Champion. Raw superstar Kurt Angle won the battle royal last eliminating Mark Henry and winning the vacant title thus also starting a rivalry between the two. This also made Angle leave Raw and move to SmackDown!. The next week, Henry defeated Rey Mysterio Jr. to become the Number One Contender to Angle's title.

Event

Before the event went live on pay-per-view, Finlay defeated Brian Kendrick in a match that aired on Heat. The opening match was a 6-Way Cruiserweight Open match for the WWE Cruiserweight Championship which was held by Kid Kash at the time. Funaki, Jamie Noble, Nunzio, Paul London and Raw superstar Gregory Helms joined the match to challenge Kash for the Cruiserweight Championship. A memorable spot from this match was Paul London executing a shooting star press onto all of the challengers. Gregory Helms executed a flying neckbreaker on London. Kid Kash nailed London with a Dead Level. He covered London but Nunzio and Funaki broke up the count. Noble held Funaki in the dragon sleeper. Helms attempted a shining wizard on Noble, but he avoided the move. Helms threw Noble out of the ring and then pinned Funaki after a shining wizard to win the Cruiserweight title.

The second match was a divas match between Mickie James and Ashley Massaro. Trish Stratus was the Special Guest Referee for this match. Before the match started, Mickie told Trish backstage that she loved her. While the match started, Ashley worked over Mickie's arm. While Ashley pounded Mickie into the corner, Trish pulled Mickie. Mickie would later up work out on Ashley's back and neck. Ashley made a comeback in the match but finally Mickie powerbombed her to win the match.

In the third match The Boogeyman faced John "Bradshaw" Layfield (with his valet Jillian Hall). In the match, JBL tried to do everything to measure out Boogeyman. Finally, JBL had Boogeyman measured and went for the Clothesline from Hell but he missed the move and was sent crashing shoulder first into the post. Boogeyman nailed JBL with a pumphandle slam to win the match. After the match, he tried to throw worms in JBL's mouth but JBL threw his valet Jillian into the ring and Boogeyman threw worms in her mouth.

The fourth match was the 2006 Royal Rumble match. Triple H drew as the No. 1 entrant while Rey Mysterio drew No. 2. Mysterio and Triple H fought off each other in the beginning of the match. Later on, the two teamed up to eliminate No. 3 entrant Simon Dean. Mysterio eliminated No. 4 entrant Psicosis on his own. Ric Flair drew No. 5 but he made a mistake by charging Triple H near the ropes. Triple H simply sidestepped the charge and eliminated Flair from the match. No. 6 entrant was Big Show and No. 7 entrant was Jonathan Coachman. Coach was quickly eliminated with a swat of Big Show's hand. Bobby Lashley drew No. 8 while Big Show's World Tag Team Championship partner at the time, Kane drew No. 9, while making made his tenth appearance in a Royal Rumble match, tying the record for most Royal Rumble appearances with Rikishi. It also marked his eighth consecutive appearance in the Royal Rumble as Kane, breaking the previous record of seven consecutive appearances held by himself, Owen Hart and Rick Martel.

Big Show and Kane teamed up to eliminate Lashley and then the two targeted each other trying to eliminate each other at the ropes. Triple H took the advantage and eliminated both men from behind. In addition, Tatanka and Rob Van Dam returned to WWE television in this Royal Rumble match with Tatanka drawing No. 15 while RVD drawing No. 20. RVD taking down all superstars in the ring (except Mysterio). He went to eliminate Road Warrior Animal, Goldust, and later Carlito. Shawn Michaels entered No. 25 into the match and started attacking his enemies. He went on to eliminate Trevor Murdoch, Johnny Nitro and Shelton Benjamin.

As Michaels eliminated Benjamin from the match, Mr. McMahon's music played which distracted Michaels. McMahon made his way to the ring while Shane McMahon (not an official entrant) eliminated Michaels from behind. Michaels returned to the ring and tried to attack Shane until Triple H beat him and Michaels delivered Sweet Chin Music to Triple H. As a result, Triple H, Mysterio, Carlito, RVD and Randy Orton remained the final five participants. Carlito worked on RVD but RVD countered and threw him out of the ring with the final four participants remaining. Mysterio and RVD formed an alliance against two former Evolution partners Triple H and Orton. RVD tried to perform a five-star frog splash on Orton, but Triple H attacked RVD and then threw Mysterio into RVD which sent RVD crashing to the floor.

Triple H, Mysterio and Orton were the final three participants. Triple H and Orton teamed to eliminate Mysterio but failed to do so, instead Mysterio performed a 619 on both men, and then eliminated Triple H from the match. As retaliation, Triple H assaulted Mysterio and threw him into the steel steps, before rolling him back into the ring for Orton to eliminate. Orton tried to eliminate Mysterio, but Mysterio countered and was able to eliminate Orton to win the 2006 Royal Rumble match. Mysterio paid tribute to Guerrero by winning the match saying that he had won the match for Guerrero.  Mysterio broke the record for lasting the longest in a Royal Rumble match, 1:02:12. The previous record was 1:01:30, set by Chris Benoit at the 2004 Royal Rumble. Finally, Mysterio was the second person to win from the #2 slot, the first being Vince McMahon in the 1999 Royal Rumble.

The fifth match was between Edge and John Cena for the WWE Championship, with Edge defending the title in their New Year's Revolution rematch. Cena entered the ring on a large steel catwalk-like scaffold that had been lowered from the ceiling. Before Cena's entrance, fireworks started throughout the arena. Cena had the match in control in the beginning but later on he was forced to retreat to the floor on multiple occasions. Finally, Cena had enough and followed him, but Edge used Lita as a decoy. Edge speared Cena into the steel ring steps and following a baseball slide which threw Cena into the crowd. Edge remained in control and set Cena on the top rope but was subsequently pushed down. Cena went for a top rope splash but Edge moved away. Cena would make a comeback and try an FU but failed. Cena made a comeback during the conclusion of the match. He went for a Five Knuckle Shuffle but was distracted when Lita jumped on the apron to draw Cena's attention. Edge recovered as Cena and Lita argued, but when Edge charged, Cena sidestepped and Edge ran into Lita. Cena took advantage of the situation and quickly executed an FU on Edge and then put him into an STFU. Edge couldn't escape so he submitted making Cena the new WWE Champion.

The main event was between Kurt Angle and Mark Henry for the World Heavyweight Championship. Angle defended the title in this match against Henry. The match marked the first time that two former Olympians battled for a world title in history. Angle began the match in trying to put Henry down but instead, Henry dumped him to the floor, where Angle was beaten by former manager Daivari. Henry controlled Angle using his power but Angle managed to apply the ankle lock. After Henry kicked out after an Angle Slam, Angle locked in an ankle lock once more. Daivari distracted the referee and when Henry broke the hold again, he sent Angle crashing into the referee. At that point, Kurt got a chair. Daivari tried to stop him but Angle hit Daivari with the chair. When Angle tried to use the chair, Henry blocked the attempt and tossed Angle to the mat. As Henry advanced though, Angle low blowed Henry, which was followed by two chair shots. Angle went for the pin but Henry kicked out. Angle untied one of the turnbuckle pads on the middle rope. Angle ended up in that corner, but as Henry charged, Angle sidestepped and tripped him into the exposed steel. Angle rolled up Henry to retain the World Heavyweight Championship but as Angle celebrated, there was all darkness and The Undertaker's music played. Undertaker made his return to WWE television, in his first appearance since Armageddon, entering on a horse-drawn chariot. He intimidated Angle and then the ropes went down and the ring collapsed.

Aftermath
Chris Benoit and Booker T continued their feud over the WWE United States Championship. Benoit went on to win the title from Booker at No Way Out. Rey Mysterio was awarded a match against Kurt Angle for the World Heavyweight Championship which was scheduled to take place at WrestleMania 22 but before that, Mysterio defended his spot against Randy Orton at No Way Out. Orton won the match and Rey's title shot. Mysterio would later be readded to the match, forming a Triple Threat match between Angle, Mysterio and Orton. At No Way Out, Angle successfully defended the World Heavyweight Championship against The Undertaker, but lost the title to Mysterio at WrestleMania.

In February, the Road to WrestleMania tournament was arranged to determine a new number one contender to Cena's WWE Championship. This was an 8-man tournament on Raw. Triple H, Rob Van Dam and Big Show faced each other in the final round of the tournament which was a triple threat match. RVD performed a Five Star Frog Splash on Big Show, but when he made the pin, Triple H pulled the referee. While the referee was distracted, Big Show was able to kick out. Triple H took advantage and performed a Pedigree on RVD to win the tournament and become the number one contender to the WWE Championship. At WrestleMania 22, Cena defeated Triple H to retain the WWE Championship via submission after forcing Triple H to submit with the STFU.

In mid-2006, WWE launched a third brand dubbed ECW, which featured wrestlers from the former Extreme Championship Wrestling promotion, as well as newer talent. Additionally, the ECW World Heavyweight Championship was reactivated to be the brand's top championship, and third concurrently active world title in WWE.

Results

Royal Rumble entrances and eliminations

 – Raw
 – SmackDown!
 – Eliminated by a non participant
 – Legend
 – Winner

(*) Rey Mysterio broke the longevity record for lasting 1:02:15, previous record held by Chris Benoit (lasting 1:01:35) in Royal Rumble 2004. This record would stand for 17 years before it would be broken by Gunther (wrestler) (Lasting 1:11:40) in Royal Rumble (2023)

(**) Shane McMahon was not a participant in the match.

References

External links
Official website

2006
Events in Miami
2006 in professional wrestling in Florida
Professional wrestling in Miami
2006 WWE pay-per-view events
January 2006 events in the United States